Jyotsna Sonowal is an Asom Gana Parishad politician from Assam. Sonowal was elected in Assam Legislative Assembly election from Sadiya.

References 

Living people
Asom Gana Parishad politicians
21st-century Indian politicians
Members of the Assam Legislative Assembly
People from Tinsukia district
Year of birth missing (living people)